The MV Dara was a Dubai-based passenger liner, built in 1948 by Barclay, Curle & Co. Ltd., a shipyard in Glasgow, Scotland. The , four-decked vessel travelled mostly between the Persian Gulf and the Indian subcontinent, carrying expatriate passengers who were employed in the nations of the Gulf.

Dara sank in the Persian Gulf on 8 April 1961, as a result of a powerful explosion that caused the deaths of 238 of the 819 people on board at the time, including 19 officers and 113 crew. Another 565 people were rescued during an operation by a British Army tank landing craft, a number of ships of the Royal Navy, and several British and foreign merchant ships.

Sinking
The vessel had sailed from Bombay on 23 May, on a round trip to Basra, calling at intermediate ports. Dara arrived at Dubai on 7 April and was unloading cargo, embarking and disembarking passengers when the wind picked up; it quickly reached force seven and prevented further work. The Dara was hit by another boat which had dragged its anchor in the bad weather and Captain Elson decided to take the ship out of harbour to ride out the storm. Due to the conditions there had been no opportunity to disembark those people on board who did not intend to travel, including relatives and friends seeing off passengers, cargo handlers and various shipping and immigration officials.

At approximately 04.30 on 8 April 1961, a large explosion struck the port side of the engine casing between decks, passing through the engine bulkhead and two upper decks, including the main lounge. The explosion occurred as Dara was returning to the harbour and it started a series of large fires. The explosion affected all electrical, fire-water and steering systems, and the fire spread rapidly, aided by the wind. The captain ordered the evacuation of the ship.

Launching the lifeboats was chaotic in the rough seas; one witness described an overcrowded lifeboat overturning due to the height of the waves. A second lifeboat which had been damaged earlier during the storm was intercepted by the lifeboat of a Norwegian tanker.There were several ships nearby and aid was given by British, German and Japanese vessels in the vicinity, as well as boats travelling from Dubai, Sharjah, Ajman and Umm Al Qawain.

A nearly completed hotel building in Dubai was taken over as a reception centre for the injured, many of whom were suffering from burns, exposure and wounds from flying metal shards. The tide of injured people overwhelmed Al Maktoum Hospital and field stations were opened at Sheikh Rashid's Customs House office block.

In the days following, three British frigates and a US destroyer sent parties on board the Dara to extinguish the fires and the vessel was then taken in tow by the Glasgow salvage vessel Ocean Salvor, but she sank at 09.20 on 10 April 1961.

Possible cause of explosion
The explosion is believed to have been caused by a deliberately placed explosive device, planted by an Omani rebel group or individual insurgents.  A British Admiralty court concluded, more than a year after the disaster, that an anti-tank mine, "deliberately placed by a person or persons unknown", had "almost certainly" caused the explosion. British Solicitor General Sir John Hobson, testifying before the court, said that fighters in the Dhofar Rebellion were likely to be responsible, having previously sabotaged British assets. However, no forensic evidence has ever been provided to prove that a bomb was the cause.

Wreck

References

External links
 
  (with photo) Warning this website appears to have been hijacked

Maritime incidents in 1961
Ship bombings
Shipwrecks in the Persian Gulf
1947 ships
Ships built on the River Clyde
Passenger ships
Acts of sabotage